Department of Employment and Industrial Relations may refer to:

 Australian Government Department of Employment and Industrial Relations (1975–1978)
 Australian Government Department of Employment and Industrial Relations (1982–1987)
 Queensland Government Department of Employment and Industrial Relations